Ali-Ollie Woodson (born Ollie Creggett; September 12, 1951 – May 30, 2010) was an American R&B singer, musician, songwriter, keyboardist, drummer, and occasional actor best known for his twelve years with the Temptations alongside Otis Williams. He also worked with Aretha Franklin, Jean Carn, and Bill Pinkney.

Early life and career

Woodson was born September 12, 1951 in Detroit, Michigan, and was raised in Town Creek, Alabama.

Woodson was best known as the lead singer of Motown act the Temptations from 1984 to 1986, and from 1988 to 1996. He had first recorded with the Temptations in 1983 on their Back to Basics album, when he was invited to perform lead vocals on the album track, "Stop the World Right Here (I Wanna Get Off)", filling in for Dennis Edwards.

Illness and death
According to his testimony at a televised religious service, Woodson was first diagnosed with throat cancer during one of his tenures with The Temptations. Woodson would again need to undergo surgery when the cancer returned two years later and another two years following that surgery. In late 2008, Woodson was diagnosed with leukemia and hospitalized for several weeks. He died in Los Angeles, California on May 30, 2010, after having leukemia for nearly eighteen months.

References

External links

Ali Ollie Woodson interview by Pete Lewis, 'Blues & Soul' December 2001 (reprinted June 2010)
Ali Ollie Woodson feature with an interview at Soul Express

1951 births
2010 deaths
People from Town Creek, Alabama
African-American male singers
American male singer-songwriters
American keyboardists
American soul musicians
Deaths from cancer in California
Musicians from Detroit
The Temptations members
Deaths from leukemia
Burials at Forest Lawn Memorial Park (Glendale)
Motown artists
African-American songwriters
Singer-songwriters from Michigan
Singer-songwriters from Alabama